The 2023 Montreal Alouettes season is scheduled to be the 56th season for the team in the Canadian Football League and their 68th overall. The Alouettes will attempt to improve upon their 9–9 record from 2022, make the playoffs for the fourth consecutive season, and win their eighth Grey Cup championship. 

The 2023 CFL season is scheduled to be the third season with Danny Maciocia as the team's general manager. It will also be the first season with a new head coach after both Maciocia and the team's president, Mario Cecchini, stated that a new coach would be hired following Maciocia's interim appointment in the position in 2022. On December 8, 2022, the Alouettes had announced that the five candidates that were interviewed were Byron Archambault, André Bolduc, Anthony Calvillo, Jason Maas, and Noel Thorpe. On December 17, 2022, it was announced that Jason Maas had been named the 27th head coach in franchise history.

Offseason

CFL Global Draft
The 2023 CFL Global Draft is scheduled to take place in the spring of 2023. If the same format as the 2022 CFL Global Draft is used, the Alouettes will have three selections in the draft with the fifth-best odds to win the weighted draft lottery.

CFL National Draft
The 2023 CFL Draft is scheduled to take place in the spring of 2023. The Alouettes currently have eight selections in the eight-round draft but acquired an additional first-round pick from the BC Lions following the Vernon Adams trade. The team traded their third-round selection to the Edmonton Elks in the trade for Nafees Lyon and Thomas Costigan.

The Alouettes are scheduled to have the fifth selection in each of the eight rounds of the draft after losing the East Semi-Final and finishing fifth in the 2022 league standings, not including traded picks.

Preseason

Schedule

Regular season

Standings

Schedule

Team

Roster

Coaching staff

References

External links
 

Montreal Alouettes seasons
2023 Canadian Football League season by team
2023 in Quebec
2020s in Montreal